William Robert Hamilton (–12 October 1917) was a Scottish poet and First World War soldier. He was born in Dumfries, Scotland. He emigrated to South Africa where a portion of his education was at the South African College, Cape Town. He was killed on the Western Front in Flanders, Belgium in 1917 and is remembered on the Tyne Cot Memorial, at the Tyne Cot British Cemetery and Memorial, at Ypres in Flanders, Belgium.

The reference to him reads:

Publications
 William Hamilton. Modern Poems. Oxford: B. H. Blackwell, 1917. 011648.eee.17 British Library
 William Hamilton. Moths and Fairies: A Play. 1912.

Poem by William Hamilton:

The Song of an Exile

I have seen the Cliffs of Dover
And the White Horse on the Hill;
I have walked the lanes, a rover;
I have dreamed beside the rill:
I have known the fields awaking
To the gentle touch of Spring;
The joy of morning breaking,
And the peace your twilights bring.

But I long for a sight of the pines, and the blue shadows under;For the sweet-smelling gums, and the throbbing of African air;For the sun and the sand, and the sound of the surf's ceaseless thunder,The height, and the breadth and the depth, and the nakedness there.

I have visited your cities
Where the unregenerate dwell;
I have trilled the ploughman's ditties
To the mill-wheel and the well.
I have heard the poised lark singing
To the blue of summer skies;
The whirr of pheasants winging,
And the crash when grouse arise.

But I sigh for the heat of the veld, and the cool-flowing river;For the crack of the trek-whip, the shimmer of dust-laden noon:For the day sudden dying; the croak of the frogs, and the shiverOf tropical night, and the stars, and the low-hanging moon.

I have listen'd in the gloaming
To your poets' tales of old;
I know, when I am roaming,
That I walk on hallowed mould.
I have lived and fought among you
And I trow your hearts are steel;
That the nations who deride you
Shall, like dogs, be brought to heel.

But I pine for the roar of the lion on the edge of the clearing;For the rustle of grass snake; the birds' flashing wing on the heath;For the sun-shrivelled peaks of the mountains to blue heaven rearing;The limitless outlook, the space, and the freedom beneath.

Source Original text: William Hamilton, Modern Poems (Oxford: B. H. Blackwell, 1917): 50–51. 011648.eee.17 British Library First publication date: 1917

British Army personnel of World War I
Coldstream Guards officers
20th-century Scottish poets
British military personnel killed in World War I
People from Dumfries
Scottish World War I poets
20th-century British male writers
Scottish male poets
Year of birth uncertain
1917 deaths
1890s births